Kinsella is a hamlet in Alberta, Canada within Beaver County.

The hamlet is located in census division No. 10 and in the federal riding of Vegreville-Wainwright.

Demographics 
The population of Kinsella according to the 2009 municipal census conducted by Beaver County is 40.

Research Station
The Roy Berg Kinsella Research Station is located directly northwest of the community. Founded in 1960, it is run by the University of Alberta.

Climate

See also 
List of communities in Alberta
List of hamlets in Alberta

References 

Hamlets in Alberta
Beaver County, Alberta